Hidden World is the debut album by hardcore punk band Fucked Up. It was released on double vinyl by Deranged Records and on CD by Jade Tree. It is the band's first long-play record. Hidden World was picked as #1 punk album of the year by Canadian magazine Exclaim! and was also nominated for the 2007 PLUG Independent Music Awards Punk Album of the Year.

Releases 

October 9, 2006 - On Jade Tree, CD 
October 2006 - On Deranged Records, vinyl (double LP)
February 2007 - On Welfare Records, 8 Track (Limited to 75 copies)
September 7, 2013 - On Sexbeat Records, cassette

Track listing

Art 

The cover art shows a goddess rising above a river and the field of snakes. Another piece of art in the booklet shows these snakes emerging from a giant tentacle/Cornucopia. It also features many sigils. The album's logo is Vesica piscis, or Venn diagram of two sets, presumably the real world and the hidden world. It was illustrated by Jason Gardner of Buckland, Massachusetts.

References

External links 
 Hidden World Cd

Fucked Up albums
2006 debut albums
Deranged Records albums
Jade Tree (record label) albums